Enterocloster bolteae, formerly Clostridium bolteae, is a gram-positive, rod-shaped bacterium from the genus Enterocloster. E. bolteae is obligately anaerobic and capable of forming spores. The type species was isolated from a human stool sample.

References

 

Bacteria described in 2003
Lachnospiraceae